The Embassy of the Republic of Singapore in Manila is the diplomatic mission of Singapore in the Philippines. The chancery is located at 505 Rizal Drive in Bonifacio Global City, Taguig, Metro Manila.

Background 
Full diplomatic relations commenced between Singapore and the Philippines on May 16, 1969. Singaporean interests in the Philippines were handled by the Malaysian Embassy prior to the establishment of the chancery. The first resident ambassador accredited to the Philippines was Haji Ya'acob bin Mohamed, when he presented his credentials to then President Ferdinand Marcos on October 16, 1969. Finally, the embassy was established in 1973.

The Embassy 
The embassy is currently headed by Ambassador Gerard Ho Wei Hong and staffed by the Deputy Chief of Mission and Counsellor, another Counsellor, the Defence Attaché, the First Secretary, the First Secretary (Political) and the Second Secretary (Admin & Consular). The present chancery is designed by Forum Architects of Singapore together with local EBP Architects, to complete the multi-structure complex in 2008. Its former location was housed in The Enterprise Center Tower 1 in Makati Central Business District.

See also 
Embassy of the Philippines, Singapore
List of diplomatic missions of Singapore
Philippines–Singapore relations

References 

Manila
Singapore
Bonifacio Global City
Philippines–Singapore relations